This is a list of electoral results for the Electoral district of Scoresby in Victorian state elections.

Members for Scoresby

Election results

Elections in the 2010s

Elections in the 2000s

Elections in the 1970s

Elections in the 1960s

Elections in the 1950s

Elections in the 1940s

References

 

Victoria (Australia) state electoral results by district